Formigoniani refers to the faction around Roberto Formigoni, a leading member of Forza Italia, a political party in Italy.

See also

Network Italy